The 1983–84 St. Louis Blues season was the 17th in franchise history.  It involved the team finishing with a 32-41-7 record, good for 71 points, while placing second place in the Norris Division. It was also the season that The Checkerdome was renamed as The Arena, going back to its original name.

Offseason
The Blues did not participate in the 1983 NHL Entry Draft, shortly after the league blocked the franchise's relocation to Saskatoon, Saskatchewan.

Regular season

Final standings

Schedule and results

Playoffs

Player statistics

Regular season
Scoring

Goaltending

Playoffs
Scoring

Goaltending

Awards and records

Transactions

Farm teams

See also
1983–84 NHL season

References

 
 Blues on Hockey Database

External links

St. Louis Blues seasons
St. Louis
St. Louis
St Louis
St Louis